La saga de los Rius is a Spanish historical drama television series directed by Pedro Amalio López. It consists of an adaptation of the three first novels of the Ignacio Agustí's pentalogy La ceniza fue árbol. It aired from November 1976 to January 1977 on TVE1.

Premise 
The fiction follows the vicissitudes of the Catalan industrial bourgeoisie from 1880 to 1916, conveyed through three generations of the Rius family.

Cast 
 Fernando Guillén as Joaquín Rius.
 Maribel Martín as Mariona Rebull.
 Alejandro Ulloa.
 Nadala Batiste.
 José María Caffarel as Don Desiderio Rebull.
 Emilio Gutiérrez Caba as Desiderio Rius.
  as Crista.
  as Lula.
 Teresa Gimpera as Jeannine.
 
 .
 Josep Minguell.
 Carmen Fortuny as Doña Clotilde.
 Montserrat García Sagués as Mercedes.
 Montserrat Carulla as Evelina.
 Ramiro Oliveros as Ernesto.
  as Federico.
  as Doña África.
  as Javier.
  as Llobet padre.
 José Peñalver as Bernardo.
 Víctor Guillén as employee.

Production 
La saga de los Rius consists of an adaptation of the first three novels of the Ignacio Agustí's pentalogy La ceniza fue árbol: Mariona Rebull (1944), El viudo Rius (1945), and Desiderio (1957). The inception of the series predates the death of Francisco Franco.

Besides the set filming in the TVE studios in Barcelona, outdoor shooting locations included Barcelona, Seville, Madrid and Granada.

It aired in prime time on TVE1 from 7 November 1976 to 30 January 1977. It originally consisted of 13 episodes with a running time of about 60 minutes. The adapted screenplay was authored by Juan Felipe Vila Sanjuán. The series, directed by Pedro Amalio López, was shot in color and a 35 mm format. Six years later, the series was dubbed into Catalan and adapted to a 10-episode format.

References 
Citations

Bibliography
 

La 1 (Spanish TV channel) network series
Television series set in the 1890s
Television series set in the 1900s
Television series set in the 1910s
Television series based on Spanish novels
Television shows set in Barcelona
Television shows set in Catalonia
Television shows set in Andalusia
1976 Spanish television series debuts
1977 Spanish television series endings
1970s Spanish drama television series